The UN Recommendations on the Transport of Dangerous Goods are contained in the UN Model Regulations prepared by the Subcommittee of Experts on the Transport of Dangerous Goods of the United Nations Economic and Social Council (ECOSOC). They cover the transport of dangerous goods by all modes of transport except by bulk tanker. They are not obligatory or legally binding on individual countries, but have gained a wide degree of international acceptance: they form the basis of several international agreements and many national laws.

"Dangerous goods" (also known as "hazardous materials" or "HAZMAT" in the United States) may be a pure chemical substance (for example, trinitrotoluene (TNT), nitroglycerin), mixtures (for example, dynamite, gunpowder) or manufactured articles (for example, ammunition, fireworks). The transport hazards that they pose are grouped into nine classes, which may be subdivided into divisions and/or packing groups. The most common dangerous goods are assigned a UN number, a four digit code which identifies it internationally: less common substances are transported under generic codes such as "UN1993: flammable liquid, not otherwise specified".

The UN Recommendations do not cover the manufacture, use or disposal of dangerous goods.

History and principles 

The first version of the Recommendations on the Transport of Dangerous Goods was produced by the ECOSOC in 1956. From 1996, the Recommendations were effectively split into two parts: the Model Regulations, which form a suggested drafting for laws and regulations on the transport of dangerous goods; and the Manual of Tests and Criteria, which contains technical information about methods of testing products to ascertain their hazards. The 22nd edition of the Recommendations was published in 2021.

The container requirements include some material and construction requirements but also performance testing is required. The package testing is based on the packing group (hazard level) of the contents, the quantity of material, and the type of container.

The UN recommendations are implemented by regulatory bodies in each country: Transport Canada, United States Department of Transportation, etc.  Some carriers have additional requirements.

Pictograms

See also 
 Globally Harmonized System of Classification and Labelling of Chemicals (GHS)
 
 
 , (part of the International Convention for the Safety of Life at Sea)

Notes

References 

ASTM D4919- Standard Specification for Testing of Hazardous Materials Packaging
ASTM D7387- Standard Test Method for Vibration Testing of Intermediate Bulk Containers (IBCs) Used for Shipping Liquid Hazardous Materials (Dangerous Goods)
ISO 16104 - 2003 Packaging - Transport packaging for dangerous goods - Test methods
 Soroka, W, "Fundamentals of Packaging Technology", IoPP, 2002, 
 Yam, K. L., "Encyclopedia of Packaging Technology", John Wiley & Sons, 2009,

External links 
 Dangerous Goods at the United Nations Economic Commission for Europe
 UN Recommendations on the Transport of Dangerous Goods - Model Regulations
 Performance tests of selected plastic drums, National Research Council Canada, February 2005. TP 14396E, Transport Canada
 Drop tests of selected steel drums, InNOVAcorp, 2003. TP 14093E, Transport Canada
 Bulk Bags (FIBC - Flexible Intermediate Bulk Containers) and The UN Code

Chemical safety
Safety codes
Hazardous materials
Packaging
United Nations documents